"Run with the Fox" is a 1981 Christmas song written, composed, produced, and performed by Chris Squire and Alan White, with Peter Sinfield co-writing lyrics. Both former Yes members, Squire and White recorded the song after a new band (XYZ with Led Zeppelin guitarist Jimmy Page) seemed unlikely to happen, and released the single under their own names as a collaborative piece.

Andrew Pryce Jackman, a childhood friend and frequent collaborator of Squire, was in charge of orchestration and since they had both been boy choristers with Barry Rose at St. Andrew's Church, Kingsbury, they contacted him to provide a boys choir to do the backing. By this time Rose was at St Paul's Cathedral, so it is the St Paul's boys who appear on the song. The B-side of the single, "Return of the Fox", is an instrumental variation of "Run with the Fox'. It features Dave Lawson (ex-Greenslade keyboardist) on keyboards, and Squire's then-wife Nikki on backing vocals. Following "Run with the Fox", both musicians collaborated again in the band Cinema which ultimately led to the reformation of Yes. The song would feature on Squire's festive album Chris Squire's Swiss Choir with another choir dubbed onto the track, but otherwise remaining the same.

Personnel 
 Chris Squire – lead vocals, bass guitar, production
 Alan White – drums, piano, keyboards, backing vocals, production
 The boys of St Paul's Cathedral – choir
 Unknown recorder player 
 Unknown orchestra - strings
 Andrew Pryce Jackman – orchestration
 Nigel Luby – recording
 Gregg Jackman – mixing

References

1981 singles
1981 songs
Atlantic Records singles
British Christmas songs
Songs written by Chris Squire
Songs written by Alan White (Yes drummer)
Songs with lyrics by Peter Sinfield